Lough MacNean is a large freshwater lake on the border between Northern Ireland and the Republic of Ireland.

It is in two parts. Lower Lough MacNean (or Lough Nilly), the smaller eastern lake, is wholly within County Fermanagh (in Northern Ireland). Upper Lough MacNean, the larger western lake, is split between Fermanagh, County Cavan and County Leitrim (in the Republic of Ireland). On the strip of land between the two lakes are the villages of Belcoo (Fermanagh) and Blacklion (Cavan). A river runs between the villages, linking the eastern and western lakes. 
 
The shape of Lough MacNean changed during the 1960s when a major draining operation took place; before this, the lake was used for eel fishing, but dredging during the drainage process decimated their numbers.

Islands
Upper Lough MacNean
Bilberry Island
Garrow (or Buck) Islands
Inishkeen
Inishteig
Kilrooskagh Island
Patrick's Island
Port Island
Rosscorkey Island
Trawnish
Tuam Island

Lower Lough MacNean
Cushrush Island
Inishee

Cushrush, Inishteig, Kilrooscagh and Rosscorkey are now fayed to the land by small bridges. Cushrush seems to have been dwelt since the Mesolithic period as many microlithic flint tools have been found there.

There are also the remains of two crannogs; one in each lake. These were small manmade (or partially manmade) islands used as dwellings in ancient times.

See also 
 List of loughs in Ireland

References

External links 

 The Lough Macnean Valley – Northern Ireland Environment Agency

Lakes of County Fermanagh
Lakes of County Cavan
Lakes of County Leitrim